Cobalt International Energy, Inc. is a development stage petroleum exploration and production company headquartered in Houston, Texas. Cobalt International Energy Inc. filed for bankruptcy on December 14, 2017.

Current operations
The company has reserves deepwater in the Gulf of Mexico and offshore Angola and Gabon in West Africa.

The company owns a 9.375% working interest in the Heidelberg field, approximately 140 miles south of Port Fourchon off the Louisiana coast, which is operated by Anadarko Petroleum.

History
The company was founded in November 2005.

In December 2009, the company became a public company via an initial public offering, raising $850 million.

In 2012, the United States Department of Justice initiated an investigation into allegations that the company engaged in bribery in Angola, in violation of the Foreign Corrupt Practices Act. The investigation was closed in 2017.

In April 2013, James Painter, the president of the company, resigned.

In 2015, the company reached an agreement to sell its Angolan assets for $1.75 billion to Sonangol Group. However, the deal fell through after Isabel dos Santos took over the company.

In May 2016, Timothy J. Cutt, formerly of BHP, was named chief executive officer of the company.

Cobalt International Energy filed for bankruptcy on December 14, 2017 in the U.S. Bankruptcy Court in Houston. At the time, it had 82 workers, with 31 temporary workers and 19 independent contractors.

To the dismay of many, on April 10, 2018 Cobalt International Energy terminated shareholders interest in the company as part of the bankruptcy agreement.

References

External links
   

Oil companies of the United States
Natural gas companies of the United States
Petroleum in Texas
Companies based in Houston
Energy companies established in 2005
Non-renewable resource companies established in 2005
2005 establishments in Texas
Companies formerly listed on the New York Stock Exchange
Companies that filed for Chapter 11 bankruptcy in 2017